Adrián Patiño Carpio (19 February 1895 - 4 April 1951) was a prominent Bolivian military musician, band director, and music composer. Patiño was responsible for incorporate Bolivian popular folk tradition in the Bolivian Army.

Biography and professional career 
Adrián Patiño was born on 19 February 1895 in the capital of La Paz. In 1900, he began his primary and then his secondary studies in 1909, graduating in 1912 from the Don Bosco school. At the same time, he also studied music at the city's National Conservatory of Music. He later organized and directed different groups of student and orchestral groups.

Due to his recognized ability, Patiño was invited in 1926 to join the Band of the 4th Loa Infantry Regiment as director of the music, receiving the rank of second lieutenant. He rose to fame through his achievements in music band contests all over Latin America and particularly at an event in Argentina, where he performed his own compositions and the works of other international composers.

In July of that same year, Patiño successfully led the band from the 3rd Pérez Regiment who accompanied the Bolivian delegation invited to the inauguration of the monument of President Bartolomé Mitre in commemoration of the centennial of his birth. Once the Chaco War was over, Patiño was promoted to lieutenant colonel, with the position of General Director of the Army Music Bands, and presided over the Army Music School in Viacha for 15 years until his death in 1951. Patiño's patronage caused it to reach levels of professionalism and international recognition never seen in the country.

Adrián Patiño died in the city of La Paz on 4 April 1951 at the age of 56.

Legacy 
The Military School of Music of the Army was created by Supreme Decree on 20 May 1889 and it assumed the name of "Tcnl. Adrián Patiño" in 1951. It was the result of petitions from the ex-prisoners of the Chaco War. Khunuskiwa (Nevando Está) is a march that was made in honor of him. His musical productions from his military service continues to be used this day in civic and military parades. The most notable of these marches include the Presidential March and the Police Hymn.

Works

Military Marches 

 Go Ahead Collasuyu
 Union Make Force
 Zalles March
 Peru-Bolivian Fellowship
 Philharmonic May 1st
 The patriotism of the worker, Copacabana
 Glorious Clarín del Chaco
 Presidential March (dedicated to President Tcnl. Germán Busch)
 Called Loa
 Pérez Regiment
 Lonely Star
 Guard of honor
 General Carlos Quintanilla Quiroga
 Laurels
 Laurels and gold stars
 Through the vast field of Sport
 Honor and lealty
 Sergeant Tejerina
 Healthy and Strong or Hymn to the Bolivian athlete
 The Sergeants
 Memories of Bolivia
 Beni
 Student Union
 Bolivian Conscript
 Tricolor Flag
 The Athlete

Funeral Marches 

 Mother listen to my prayer
 Peace, glory and memory
 My heart weeps at your departure

Hymns 

 Hymn of the Military College of the Army
 Hymn to the Bolivian Sportsman
 Hymn to the Red Cross
 Pre-Military Choral March
 Hymn to the Cavalry Weapon
 Hymn of the Bolivian Socialist Phalanx
 Police Anthem
 The Strongest Club Anthem
 Anthem of the Lourdes School

Fox-trots 

 Heart of gold
 Adored Eleníta
 Cantumarqueñita
 Lurpila
 Irpaveñita
 Irpastay
 La Huerta
 Wake up sweetheart
 My little shepherdess
 Darling
 Q'uniskiwa or Snowing Is
 Andean dawn

References 

1895 births
1951 deaths
Bolivian musicians
20th-century conductors (music)
Military musicians
People from La Paz
Bolivian military personnel